Adderley is a civil parish in Shropshire, England.  It contains 26 listed buildings that are recorded in the National Heritage List for England.  Of these, one is listed at Grade I, the highest of the three grades, and the others are at Grade II, the lowest grade. Apart from the village of Adderley, the parish is rural.  Two country houses were demolished in the 1950s, Adderley Hall, and Shavington Hall, but a number of structures associated with them have survived and are listed, including stable blocks, farmhouses and farm buildings, and bridges.  The Shropshire Union Canal passes through the parish, and a number of bridges and two mileposts associated with it are listed.  The other listed buildings include a church and associated structures.


Key

Buildings

References

Citations

Sources

Lists of buildings and structures in Shropshire